Anemodouri (Greek: Ανεμοδούρι) is a village in the municipal unit Falaisia, southwestern Arcadia, Greece. It is located on the northwestern slopes of mount Tsemperou. It is 3 km northwest of Anavryto, 3 km southeast of Rapsommatis, 4 km west of Paparis and 9 km southeast of Megalopoli.

Population

See also
List of settlements in Arcadia

References

External links
Anemodouri (in Greek)
GTP - Anemodouri

Falaisia
Populated places in Arcadia, Peloponnese